Steven Earl Clemants (1954-2008) was an American botanist and Vice President for Science at the Brooklyn Botanic Garden. He was a graduate faculty member of both Rutgers University and the City University of New York,
and a long time member and former President of the Torrey Botanical Society.

Works

Botanical references

References

External links 

1954 births
2008 deaths
Torrey Botanical Society members
Rutgers University faculty
City University of New York faculty
20th-century American botanists
21st-century American botanists